Kaniecki is a Polish surname. Notable people with the surname include:

 Bartosz Kaniecki (born 1988), Polish footballer
 Jarosław Kaniecki (born 1967), Polish athlete
 Krzysztof Kaniecki, Polish athlete
 Michael Joseph Kaniecki (1935–2000), American bishop

Polish-language surnames